Skartaris is a fictional Hollow Earth fantasy setting created by Mike Grell for the sword and sorcery comic book The Warlord, published by DC Comics. Skartaris debuted in 1st Issue Special #8 (November 1975), where the character Travis Morgan, a U.S. Air Force pilot, discovers a passage into this world through the Earth's North Pole. Subsequent to that first issue, the Warlord series tells of Morgan's adventures in Skartaris.

Publication history
According to Mike Grell, creator of Skartaris and The Warlord, "the name comes from the mountain peak Scartaris that points the way to the passage to the earth's core in Journey to the Center of the Earth".

While Grell never drew a map of Skartaris during his tenure on the book, one was created towards the end of the original volume's run, and the illustration appeared in The Warlord Annual #4 (1985). In an interview from Comic Scene in 1983, he says: "I did things like moving my character around the countryside; I never drew a map so I could move him from one side of Skartaris to the other just for the sake of the story". In a later interview with Comic Book Resources Grell said: "Anything that can happen in fantasy happens in the lore and it's one of the reasons I always refused to draw a map of Skartaris. Year after year after year went by, and I was always hounded by the editors, 'When are you going to have a map?' The reason I refused was because once you draw a map, you establish boundaries. And why would you want to put boundaries on your imagination?"

History
Skartaris is essentially a translation of Edgar Rice Burroughs' Pellucidar into the graphic medium, with elements of Jules Verne and half a dozen other fictional Hollow Earth settings, and the mixture of magic and the Atlantis myth. In Grell's concept, as in Burroughs', the Earth is a hollow shell with Skartaris as the internal surface of that shell. Skartaris is accessible to the surface world via a polar opening allowing passage between the inner and outer worlds. There are also various tunnels connecting the interior world with the surface. Skartaris is lit by a miniature sun suspended at the center of the hollow sphere, so it is perpetually overhead wherever one is in Skartaris. The miniature sun never changes in brightness, and never sets; so with no night or seasonal progression, the natives have little concept of time. There is however, a "moon" that orbits the sun in a random way, resulting in certain areas of Skartaris being covered in darkness from time to time. The events of the series suggest that time is elastic, passing at different rates in different areas of Skartaris and varying even in single locales.

Skartaris is populated by primitive people of various levels of culture ranging from the primitive to medieval, with the most advanced inhabiting city state monarchies such as Shamballah (based on the mythical Tibetan realm of Shambhala), the home of Morgan's principal love interest Tara. The practice of magic is well developed, numerous sorcerers being known, usually antagonistic to each other and to Morgan; the most prominent is Deimos, his main antagonist. Remnants of the super-scientific technology of Atlantis can also be found. Skartaris is overrun by a variety of prehistoric creatures from all geological eras, notably dinosaurs.

Most early issues of the comic characterize the setting with the following tag phrase: "In the savage world of Skartaris, life is a constant struggle for survival. Here, beneath an unblinking orb of eternal sunlight, one simple law prevails: If you let down your guard for an instant you will soon be very dead".

Skartaris was eventually retconned into being located in another dimension instead of physically inside the Earth. Thousands of years ago, before it was colonized by humans, this dimension was known as "Wizard World" because of the number of magical beings that lived in it.

New Atlantis

Atlantean survivors of the city of Challa-Bel-Nalla, then ruled by Lord Daamon (an ancestor of Deimos), formed an alliance with an alien race they called the Red-Moon Gods. These aliens provided the Atlanteans with advanced technology that Travis Morgan would later discover in New Atlantis. New Atlantis first appears in The Warlord Annual #2 (1983). Lord Norrad the Younger, one of the Atlantean Knights of the Sea Eagle left Atlantis with a small group of followers and travelled to Skartaris. Yet another group led by the Atlantean sorcerer Ar-Diamphos escaped the sinking of Atlantis and found New Atlantis, Ar-Diamphos had Norrad killed and made himself ruler. He transformed them into beast men known as Blood Brothers using Red-Moon God technology.

Books of Magic
Skartaris is depicted in The Books of Magic #3, part of a four-issue mini-series written by Neil Gaiman.

Suicide Squad
Skartaris is featured in the Suicide Squad: Raise the Flag limited series, and is the source of a techno-mystical artifact used by series protagonist Rick Flag, and his nemesis Rustam.

Secret Six
It is the location for the fight between the two factions of the Secret Six.

The New 52
In September 2011, The New 52 rebooted DC's continuity. In this new timeline, during the Convergence storyline, Skartaris appears deep within the planet Telos.

Points of interest
 Asravar
 Ba'al Forest - This is where Travis Morgan crashed his plane when he first arrived in Skartaris. He also met his future wife, Tara, here. There is also a race of Lizardmen living in the Ba'al Forest who worshipped Travis' plane, and he had to fight them to receive his travel gear. The Ba'al Forest is also where the Children of Ba'al live.
 Balgar Bay
 Bandakhar
 Bantham
 Baroth Mountains
 Beast Tower
 Bloodrock Mountains
 Captain Hawk's Stronghold
 Caves of the Cyclops
 Citadel of Timgad - It was formerly the great city of the Sorcerer Kings. The Citadel of Timgad is now overrun by hobgoblins and filled with traps. It's the only one that has wells in the Desert of Doom which attracts travelers.
 City of the Dead
 Desert of Doom
 Desert of Sorrows
 Doomgate Temple
 Dragon Sea
 Drakmeer
 Forest of Ebondar
 Great Fire Mountain
 Groniko
 Haunted Mountains
 Isle of Titans - An island that is home to the Skartarian Titans led by Queen Amarant. The Warlord has his first encounter with Shakira here.
 Kaambuka
 Kalibahs
 Kasamaga Island
 Kiro - This is the city where Machiste is the king of. It has a diverse population and a Thieves' Market. The Warlord and Mariah's first costumes were fashioned here.
 Lake of Dreams
 Mountains of the Sun
 North Sea
 Sea of Grel - A sea that borders Skartaris to the west. It contains ports such as Bal Shazar, Kiro, Bakwele and Kallistan. It also contains the Bay of Tears, Balgar Bay, and Captain Hawk's Stronghold. The Warlord met Ligia (a beautiful woman of the sea) who once saved his life when he was defending her.
 Bal Shazar - A sprawling seaport city that is known for its slave auctions. When the Warlord was captured, this city was where he first met Machiste.
 Bakwele - A teeming port where the Warlord, Machiste, and Mariah occasionally stop during their travels.
 Bay of Tears -  It's located in the Sea of Grel. Pirates and slave-traders tend to come into conflict with each other here.
 Kallistan
 Shaban D'aba
 Shadow Forest
 Shamballah - A great golden city that is filled with Atlantean technology. It's also the home of the Warlord's wife Tara and their son, Joshua, is Shamballah's rightful king. During the Warlord's first visit, Shamballah's computers malfunctioned and nearly killed everyone who lived there.
 Shebal Gladiator Arena - An area next to the Bay of Tears where men are trained to fight each other. The Warlord fights Machiste in a death match. Rather than kill Machiste, the Warlord kills Shebal himself and organizes a gladiator army of his own.
 Skyra - An airborne city that was maintained by a cyborg named Tragg. The Warlord, Machiste, and Mariah were brought there by Pteranodons where they were forced to kill the caretaker who had a taste for flesh. With Tragg dead, the city fell to the ground and was destroyed.
 Swamplands - The Swamplands of Skartaris are filled with poisonous snakes and semi-aquatic dinosaurs. This was where the Warlord was hunted by a man named Stryker.
 Temple Grimfang
 Temple of the Sun
 Terminator - A land of perpetual darkness where Skartaris meets Earth. Deimos built his castle here when the Mask of Life made him vulnerable to sunlight.
 Castle Deimos - This was where Deimos' castle was located.
 Thera - The first Skartarian city that the Warlord visited and where he first met Deimos who was a high priest there. Although Thera is civilized, they were looked down by the other cultures who use them for human sacrifice. The city was later sacked by The Warlord's army and Deimos was overthrown.
 Tower of Fear - A gigantic spire filled with demons who appear and disappear at random to kill anyone who enters the tower. The Warlord and Machiste were forced to enter the Tower of Fear to retrieve the Mask of Life which they did, not knowing it would be used in resurrecting Deimos.
 Umber
 Valley of the Lion
 Valley of the Snowbeast - A place in Skartaris that is always cloudy and constantly covered in snow. The Warlord met a kindly Yeti-like creature here. When Machiste accidentally killed it, it was revealed that the creature was actually a beautiful winged creature trapped in a fur-like cocoon.

In other media

 Skartaris appears in the Justice League Unlimited episode "Chaos at the Earth's Core". Green Lantern, Supergirl, Stargirl, and S.T.R.I.P.E. were summoned by The Warlord's daughter Jennifer against Deimos. Metallo and the Silver Banshee had provided his forces with energy weapons in exchange for capturing the Great Stone, which is actually a large chunk of Kryptonite. With the Justice League's help, they defeated Deimos' forces, bringing peace to Skartaris. Afterwards, Green Lantern closed the portal to Skartaris to prevent anyone from getting the Great Stone.
 In the Powerless episode "Win, Luthor, Draw", Wendy goes through a portal inside LexCorp and returns in warrior armor, claiming she had been to Skartaris.
 In the film Aquaman, Arthur and Mera descend into the Trenches pursued by the mutated Atlantean inhabitants that live there. They emerge in a subterranean world where dinosaurs have survived. Here they also discover the trident Arthur needs to claim kingship, and his mother Atlanna who has been trapped in this submerged world since she disappeared. Though unnamed, with its connection to ancient Atlanteans and surviving dinosaurs, this world within ours would seem to be Skartaris.

See also
 Dinosaur Island
 Savage Land

References

External links
 Skartaris at DC Comics Wiki
 Skartaris at Comic Vine
 DCU Guide: Skartaris
 Atlas of the DC Universe: Skartaris
 Fanzing #0: Warlord Reading Guide
 Fanzing #0: Welcome to the Lost World

Fictional elements introduced in 1975
DC Comics locations
Fantasy comics
Fictional regions
Hollow Earth in fiction
Lost world comics